Beautiful Thing is a 1996 British romantic comedy film directed by Hettie MacDonald and released by Channel 4 Films. The screenplay was written by Jonathan Harvey based on his own original play of the same name.

The film was originally intended for television broadcast only, but it was so well-received that it was subsequently released in cinemas. The atmosphere of the film is heavily influenced by a soundtrack consisting almost entirely of the music of The Mamas & the Papas and "Mama" Cass Elliot.

Plot
The story is set and filmed on Thamesmead, a working class area of South East London dominated by post-war council estates.

The main character, Jamie (Glen Berry), is a teenager who is in love with his classmate, Ste. Jamie's single mother, Sandra (Linda Henry), is pre-occupied with ambitious plans to run her own pub and has an ever-changing string of lovers; the latest of these is Tony (Ben Daniels), a neo-hippie.

Sandra finds herself at odds with Leah (Tameka Empson), a sassy and rude neighbour who has been expelled from school, takes a variety of drugs, and constantly listens and sings along to her mother's Cass Elliot records. While Jamie's homosexuality remains concealed, his introverted nature and dislike of football are reason enough for his classmates to bully him at every opportunity.

Ste (Scott Neal), who is living together with his drug-dealing brother and abusive, alcoholic father in the flat next door to Sandra and Jamie's, is beaten by his brother so badly that Sandra takes pity and lets him sleep over one night. In the absence of a third bed, Ste has to make do with sleeping 'top-to-toe' with Jamie. On the second night they share a bed, the boys change sleeping arrangements and Jamie kisses Ste for the first time.

The next morning, Ste panics, leaves the flat before Jamie has awakened, and avoids him for days. Jamie works up the nerve to steal a Gay Times from a newsagent, apparently starting to accept his sexuality and affection for Ste. Jamie finally spots Ste at a nearby party and confronts him about his sexuality; they prepare to leave together. The party ends badly, with Sandra taking vengeance on Leah for gossiping. Leah then threatens to 'spill the beans' about Ste and Jamie and confesses to having covered up for Ste in front of his father and brother. Ste reacts by angrily rejecting Jamie and running away.

Slowly, Ste accepts Jamie's love. Their relationship develops as they visit a gay pub together. Sandra follows them and discovers their secret. The film reaches its climax as a bad trip by Leah (on an unnamed drug) precipitates Sandra's breakup with Tony, the news of Sandra's new job comes out, and Sandra confronts Ste and Jamie about their relationship. Sandra comes to accept her son's sexuality.

The film ends with the two boys slow-dancing in the courtyard of their council flats to the Cass Elliot song "Dream a Little Dream of Me" while a protective Sandra dances defiantly at their side with Leah as the local residents look on. Some onlookers are shocked, some strongly disapprove and some enjoy the moment.

Cast

Critical reception
Beautiful Thing has been mostly commended by contemporary critics. The film holds a 91% approval rating on the reviewing aggregator site Rotten Tomatoes based on 22 reviews, with a weighted average of 6.67/10. The site's consensus reads: "An engaging slice of life drama that happens to double as a gay coming-of-age story, Beautiful Thing captures its place and time with deceptive depth and skill".

Roger Ebert wrote "The most interesting scenes involve the characters around them, who all but steal the movie. The boys’ lives contain few surprises, but from the other characters there is one astonishment after another." Stephen Holden from The New York Times commented "Ms. Henry is wonderful as a woman whose fighting spirit masks a streak of hard-bitten tenderness."

Home media
The film has been released multiple times on DVD through different distributors, including VCI, Film 4, Salzgeber & Co. Medien GmbH, HomeScreen, Columbia Tristar and Antiprod. Most releases include just a theatrical trailer as a special feature, but on the French Antiprod release there is an exclusive 26-minute interview with director Hettie MacDonald and a photo gallery. The debut Blu-ray release was released in France by the distributor Optimale on June 1, 2021 and is currently the only physical HD release available, only in region B/2. It is also available in HD via streaming.

Links to other media
Some of the actors that appeared in Beautiful Thing appeared in other work by Jonathan Harvey.
 Tameka Empson and Meera Syal played major roles in Beautiful People.
 Tameka Empson, Linda Henry and Scott Neal have all appeared in EastEnders together, Empson and Henry appearing as long-standing characters and Neal appearing for a 3 year stint.
 Beth Goddard appeared in Gimme Gimme Gimme.
Harvey himself made a cameo appearance in the film, which he also did in Gimme Gimme Gimme and Beautiful People.

Soundtrack

A soundtrack for the film was released by MCA Records on 15 October 1996.

Track listing

References

External links

 

1996 films
1990s buddy comedy films
1996 LGBT-related films
1996 romantic comedy films
British coming-of-age films
British teen LGBT-related films
British romantic comedy films
1990s English-language films
Film4 Productions films
British films based on plays
Films set in London
LGBT-related buddy comedy films
LGBT-related romantic comedy films
LGBT-related coming-of-age films
Mama Cass albums
The Mamas and the Papas albums
MCA Records soundtracks
Gay-related films
1990s British films
Teen LGBT-related films